Ronald Shane Love (born 30 August 1961) is an Australian politician. He is the member for the Western Australian Legislative Assembly seat of Moore, representing the National Party of Australia (WA).

On 10 March 2020, Love was elected as deputy party leader, replacing Jacqui Boydell.

On 30 January 2023, Love was elected as the leader of the National Party, replacing Mia Davies after she resigned. This also made him the leader of the opposition.

References

1961 births
Living people
Members of the Western Australian Legislative Assembly
People from Kerang
National Party of Australia members of the Parliament of Western Australia
University of Western Australia alumni
21st-century Australian politicians